Aretha Franklin Sings the Great Diva Classics is the thirty-eighth and final studio album by American recording artist Aretha Franklin and was released on October 17, 2014. It features ten covers of songs made famous by female recording artists.

This was Aretha's first and only recording for RCA Records, her first studio album to be released under a major label in 11 years (since the release of her 2003 studio album, So Damn Happy), and her first album since 1998 to be executive produced by Clive Davis, her boss at Arista Records, which has since folded into RCA. It is also her last studio album of entirely original recordings created prior to her death, as the subsequent 2017 album A Brand New Me features vintage vocal performances from the 1960s and 1970s paired with newer orchestral arrangements.

Clive Davis called the album "purely and simply sensational" and said of Aretha Franklin, "She's on fire and vocally in absolutely peak form. What a thrill to see this peerless artist still showing the way, still sending shivers up your spine, still demonstrating that all contemporary music needs right now is the voice. What a voice." Production on the album includes R&B producers Kenny "Babyface" Edmonds and Harvey Mason, Jr., hip-hop musician André 3000, and house producers Terry Hunter and Eric Kupper among others.

Critical reception

At Metacritic, which assigns a normalized rating out of 100 to reviews from mainstream critics, Aretha Franklin Sings the Great Diva Classics has an average score of 66 based on nine reviews, indicating "generally favorable reviews." Rolling Stone journalist Will Hermes called the album a "delightful covers set" that showed that "Aretha can still step into the pop world at whim with total authority." Steve Morse, writing for The Boston Globe, noted that "Divas are everywhere these days, but there’s still only one Aretha. At age 72, Franklin can still shut down the competition with a breathtaking, gospel-trained grace and power."

Entertainment Weekly critic Tim Stack found that while Franklin "delivers a rollicking take on Adele's 'Rolling in the Deep'," the "covers of other lady icons — Chaka, Barbra, Etta — feel dated or ill-conceived. It all plays like the official soundtrack to Gay Pride 1977." Allmusic editor Andy Kellman wrote that "if there's one positive thing that can be said about the results, it's that Aretha sounds like she had a ball. The energy she put into these versions helps make up for the vocal shortcomings and audible use of Auto-Tune. She could have played it simple and straight, yet she clearly enjoyed the recording process, from melismatic accents to an abundance of personalized touches [...] Some of the creative moves are very questionable."

Commercial performance
Aretha Franklin Sings the Great Diva Classics debuted at number 13 on the Billboard 200 in the United States, selling 23,000 copies in its first week. The album is her 38th top 20 album.  The album also debuted at number 3 on Billboards Top R&B/Hip-Hop Albums chart. and one on Billboard's R&B albums charts.

The first single released from the album was a cover of singer Adele's "Rolling in the Deep", subtitled as "The Aretha Version", which also includes an interpolation of the Marvin Gaye and Tammi Terrell hit, "Ain't No Mountain High Enough". The single debuted at number 47 on the Billboard Hot R&B/Hip-Hop Songs chart. Aretha Franklin thus became the first woman, and fourth artist overall (following Lil Wayne, Jay-Z and James Brown), to place 100 songs on the chart (with her first entry on the chart being "Today I Sing the Blues" in 1960).

Track listing

Notes
 signifies a vocal producer
"Rolling in the Deep (The Aretha Version)" contains an interpolation of "Ain't No Mountain High Enough" by Marvin Gaye & Tammi Terrell.
"I Will Survive (The Aretha Version)" contains an interpolation of "Survivor" by Destiny's Child.

Charts

Weekly charts

Year-end charts

Notes

Aretha Franklin albums
2014 albums
RCA Records albums
Disco albums by American artists